KUSU-FM (91.5 FM), known as Utah Public Radio, is an NPR-member radio station. It airs NPR programs, plus classical and folk music. Licensed to Utah State University in Logan, Utah, it broadcasts as Utah Public Radio on a series of 30 translators throughout the state. It is a part of the College of Humanities and Social Sciences at Utah State University.

Utah Public Radio is a member of National Public Radio (NPR) and an affiliate of Public Radio International (PRI) and of American Public Media (APM). They hold membership in Western States Public Radio, The Rocky Mountain Corporation for Public Broadcasting, the Utah Broadcasters Association, the Radio Resources Consortium, The Development Exchange, the National Translator Association, and the Public Radio Association of Development Officers (PRADO). UPR receives programming from several independent program producers, including The Beethoven Satellite Network, provider of around-the-clock classical music.

While Utah Public Radio covers nearly all of Utah, its signal is spotty at best in Salt Lake City due to the presence of two low-powered FM stations adjacent to KUSU's dial location (although Logan is part of the Salt Lake City radio market). Under adequate atmospheric conditions, and with sensitive receivers, it is possible to receive KUSU in Salt Lake City. The station once operated a translator in Salt Lake City at 96.7 FM but it was deactivated in 2005.

Repeaters

Utah Public Radio also has five high-power repeaters:
KUSR 89.5 FM, Logan
KUSK 88.5 FM, Vernal
KUSL 89.3 FM, Richfield
KUST 88.7 FM, Moab
KCEU 89.7 FM, Price

In addition to the full-power stations, KUSU is relayed by 29 translators to widen its broadcast area.

References

External links
Utah Public Radio website

Utah State University
USU-FM
USU-FM
NPR member stations
1953 establishments in Utah
Radio stations established in 1953